Elizabeth Rebecca Ward (2 December 1880 – 16 April 1978) was a prolific English writer of popular verse, religious works, and works for children, writing under the pen-name Fay Inchfawn. Her works were serialised in women's magazines, and she was sometimes known as "The Poet Laureate of the Home".

Early life and family
Elizabeth Rebecca Ward was born Elizabeth Rebecca Daniels at Portishead, Somerset, on 2 December 1880. She married Atkinson Ward (1882 – October 1965) in 1911 in the Long Ashton district of Somerset. They moved to Bradford-on-Avon in Wiltshire and in 1913 had a daughter, Mary Arundell Ward (died 1983), who was known as "Bunty" in Ward's books. In 1927, the family moved to Innisfree, a Victorian villa at Freshford, Somerset, where she lived for the rest of her life.

Career

Writing as Fay Inchfawn, Ward was a prolific author of books of popular verse during the years between the two World Wars. Her works were serialised in women's magazines and she was sometimes known as "The Poet Laureate of the Home". She also wrote books for children, some with her husband who used the pseudonym Philip Inchfawn, and numerous religious works.

Her Salute to the village (Lutterworth, 1943) was a first-hand account of the effects of the Second World War on a middle-class provincial family, with locations and people disguised using pseudonyms. Although not identified in the book, the village is presumed to be Freshford. The book describes the influx of refugees from the bombing of nearby Bath in 1942 during the "Baedeker raids", economic and  resources shortages, the blackout, fire-watching, and the building of pill-boxes and barricades in the fields so that enemy gliders could not land. It was illustrated with line drawings by Alfred Bestall who also drew Rupert Bear for The Daily Express. The book was republished in 2010 by Folly Books with a new biographical introduction by Nick McCamley.

Her memoirs were published by Lutterworth Press in 1963 as Those remembered days: A personal recording. This was followed by Something more to say: A personal recording in 1965 and Not the final word: Or, a joyful tribute in 1969.

Death
Elixabeth Ward died on 16 April 1978 at the age of 97 and is buried at St Mary's church, Limpley Stoke. A celebration of her life was held at St Mary's on what would have been her 100th birthday, which was written up for This England magazine.

Selected publications
 A book of remembrance. Ward Lock, London, c. 1930.
 As I lay thinking
 Father Neptune's treasure: The adventures of three children and a golliwog under the sea. S. W. Partridge & Co., London, 1919. (With Philip Inchfawn, pseud. Atkinson Ward)
 Having it out: Talks and readings for women's meetings
 Homely talks of a homely woman
 Homely verses of a home-lover
 Little donkey
 Living in a village
 Not the final word: Or, a joyful tribute. Lutterworth Press, 1969. 
 Picnic on the hill
 Poems from a quiet room
 Salute to the village. Lutterworth, 1943. (Illustrated by Alfred Bestall) (Republished by Folly Books, 2010)
 Senior reciter
 Something more to say: A personal recording. Lutterworth Press, 1965
 Songs of the ups; downs
 Sweet water and bitter
 The adventures of a homely woman
 The beautiful presence in the garden of the soul
 The day's journey
 The Golliwog news: A story of three children and a toy newspaper. S.W. Partridge & Co., London, 1913. (Illustrated by T.C. Smith) (With Philip Inchfawn, pseud. Atkinson Ward)
 The journal of a tent-dweller. Religious Tract Society, 1931
 The life book of Mary Watt. Ward Lock, London, 1935
 The little donkey
 The verse book of a homely woman, 1920. Republished by Standard Publications, 2009.
 Think of the lilies (Lakeland)
 Those remembered days: A personal recording. Lutterworth Press, 1963
 Through the windows of a little house (Republished by FB&C, 2017)
 Unposted letters
 Verses of a house-mother
 Who goes over the sea
 Who goes to the garden
 Who goes to the wood
 Will you come as well? Ward Lock, London, c. 1931. (Illustrated by Treyer Evans)

References

External links 
Fay Inchfawn at Allpoetry.com
Fay Inchfawn at Bradford-on-Avon.org
 

1880 births
1978 deaths
English women poets
People from Portishead, Somerset
English children's writers
Christian writers